The All-American Rejects is the debut studio album by American rock band The All-American Rejects, originally released October 15, 2002, by Doghouse Records before being re-released on February 4, 2003, by DreamWorks Records.

Production and promotion
The band duo of Tyson Ritter and Nick Wheeler recorded the album in 2001 after being signed by the independent label Doghouse Records. Sessions were held at Mission Sound and Headgear Studio, Brooklyn, New York City, with producer and engineer Tim O'Heir. He mixed the album at Mission Sound; it was mastered by Emily Lazar at The Lodge in New York City.

In October, the band went on tour with CKY. They later released The All-American Rejects on October 15, 2002. It was promoted with two release shows, and two acoustic in-store performamces. The following month, the band went on tour with Motion City Soundtrack and Northstar. The album attracted the attention of DreamWorks Records, who signed The All-American Rejects to them and re-released their LP in early 2003, when it gained commercial success; earning a Platinum Certification from Canada and a Platinum edition from the United States. On January 28, 2003, the band performed on The Late Late Show. In April 2003, the band filmed a music video for "The Last Song" in Los Angeles, California. In May 2003, the band went on a tour of Canada, with Flashlight Brown. On June 11, the band appeared on The Tonight Show with Jay Leno. Between mid-July and early August, the group appeared on the Warped Tour. On July 21, the band performed on Total Request Live. Following Warped Tour, the band appeared at the Terremoto Festival. On September 30, the band appeared on MuchOnDemand. In November, they went on on tour of the UK with Motion City Soundtrack and Limbeck.

The All-American Rejects was released as a CD, a vinyl LP pressed in orange (also pressed in a limited amount of red and blue) and a cassette tape exclusively in Indonesia.

Singles
The band's debut single "Swing, Swing" was released on December 2, 2002, when they were joined by two new members; Mike Kennerty on rhythm guitar and Chris Gaylor on drums - months after recording the album. "Swing, Swing" peaked at #8 on the Billboard Modern Rock Tracks in the United States and #13 on the UK Singles Chart respectively, gaining the band media attention on both sides of the Atlantic, a music video followed its release on January 7, 2003. The second single "The Last Song" was released on April 21, 2003 and charted on the US Billboard Modern Rock Tracks at #29 and the UK Singles Chart at #69, a music video followed its release a month later.

The band's third and final single from the album "Time Stands Still" was released on July 14, 2003, but gained no commercial success. A music video directed by Meiert Avis followed its release in August. The album's opening track "My Paper Heart" was later released in late 2003 as a promotional single - a music video made up of footage from the band's Live from Oklahoma... The Too Bad for Hell DVD! as well as their "Lost in Stillwater" documentary was released to help promote it.

Critical reception

The All-American Rejects received mixed reviews from music critics. Spin magazine gave it a grade of A−.

AllMusic stated that The All-American Rejects are "A talented band destined for great things" and that "[The band] are capable songwriters, accomplished vocalists, and skilled instrumentalists. Guitar-driven and underpinned with a humane-sounding drum machine cranking out frenetic backbeats, each cut on this self-titled debut brims with harmonies that recall the early Who and classic Beach Boys. Kaj Roth of Melodic stated that the pop rock duo had "plenty of good vibes and catchy uptempo powerpop that will force the rain to take a hike and let the sun shine through", and favoured the song "Your Star"; saying it has "A superb groove that will make you ride a horse on the rodeo" and that "'Time Stands Still' will make the flowers bloom in the middle of winter."

Elizabeth Bromstein of Now magazine was more negative towards the sound of the album and gave it a rating of 1 out of 5 stars, quoting "As if their horrifyingly overdone pop-punk thing weren’t bad enough, The All-American Rejects seem intent on embodying their name. Every last song on this record deals with lost love and loneliness. Incorporating the odd classic rock or 80s pop element doesn’t improve things. In fact, it makes it worse, since it feels like they’ve crammed everything they know in here."

The album was included at number 49 on Rock Sounds "The 51 Most Essential Pop Punk Albums of All Time" list. BuzzFeed included the album at number 35 on their "36 Pop Punk Albums You Need To Hear Before You F——ing Die" list. Alternative Press ranked "Swing, Swing" at number 19 on their list of the best 100 singles from the 2000s.

Track listing
All songs written by the All-American Rejects.

Personnel
Personnel per booklet.

The All-American Rejects
 Tyson Ritter – vocals, bass
 Nick Wheeler – guitars, drums, keyboards, programming

Production and design
 Tim O'Heir – producer, engineer, mixing
 Emily Lazar – mastering
 The All-American Rejects – art direction
 Asterik Studio – illustrations, layout
 Erin Thompson – object photography

Charts

Weekly charts

Year-end charts

Certifications

Release history

References
 Citations

Sources

External links

The All-American Rejects at YouTube (streamed copy where licensed)

The All-American Rejects albums
2002 debut albums
Doghouse Records albums